Deport is a city in Lamar and Red River counties in the U.S. state of Texas. The population was 550 at the 2020 census.

History
The city has the name of one Colonel Dee Thompson, a pioneer citizen.

Geography

Deport is located at  (33.526642, –95.316725), primarily in Lamar County. According to the United States Census Bureau, the city has a total area of 1.1 square miles (2.9 km2), all land.

The climate in this area is characterized by hot, humid summers and generally mild to cool winters.  According to the Köppen Climate Classification system, Deport has a humid subtropical climate, abbreviated "Cfa" on climate maps.

Demographics

As of the 2020 United States census, there were 550 people, 354 households, and 206 families residing in the city. As of the census of 2000, there were 718 people, 286 households, and 189 families residing in the city. The population density was 644.1 people per square mile (249.7/km2). There were 314 housing units at an average density of 281.7/sq mi (109.2/km2). The racial makeup of the city was 92.62% White, 2.92% African American, 3.06% Native American, 0.14% Pacific Islander, 0.28% from other races, and 0.97% from two or more races. Hispanic or Latino of any race were 0.56% of the population.

There were 286 households, out of which 28.0% had children under the age of 18 living with them, 48.6% were married couples living together, 14.3% had a female householder with no husband present, and 33.9% were non-families. 30.4% of all households were made up of individuals, and 20.6% had someone living alone who was 65 years of age or older. The average household size was 2.28 and the average family size was 2.82.

In the city, the population was spread out, with 21.3% under the age of 18, 7.1% from 18 to 24, 22.8% from 25 to 44, 22.0% from 45 to 64, and 26.7% who were 65 years of age or older. The median age was 43 years. For every 100 females, there were 79.1 males. For every 100 females age 18 and over, there were 68.2 males.

The median income for a household in the city was $24,265, and the median income for a family was $31,761. Males had a median income of $28,750 versus $17,250 for females. The per capita income for the city was $13,702. Below the poverty line were 15.9% of people, 7.5% of families, 14.2% of those under 18 and 10.5% of those over 64.

Education
Deport is served by the Prairiland Independent School District.

Notable people
 Red Schillings, baseball player

References

External links

Cities in Lamar County, Texas
Cities in Red River County, Texas
Cities in Texas